Lal Muhammad Khan is a Pakistani politician who had been a member of the National Assembly of Pakistan from 2008 to 2013. He had been a member of the Provincial Assembly of Khyber Pakhtunkhwa from 1988 to 1990.

Political career
He was elected to the Provincial Assembly of Khyber Pakhtunkhwa as a candidate of Pakistan Peoples Party (PPP) from Constituency PF-80 (Malakand Protected Area-II) in 1988 Pakistani general election. He received 12,079 votes and defeated an independent candidate, Ahmad Hussain Khan.

He ran for the seat of the Provincial Assembly of Khyber Pakhtunkhwa as a candidate of Pakistan Democratic Alliance (PDA) from Constituency PF-80 (Malakand Protected Area-II) in 1990 Pakistani general election but was unsuccessful. He received 9,569 votes and lost the seat to Fazle Haq, a candidate of Islami Jamhoori Ittehad (IJI).

He ran for the seat of the Provincial Assembly of Khyber Pakhtunkhwa as an independent candidate from Constituency PF-80 (Malakand Protected Area-II) in 1993 Pakistani general election but was unsuccessful. He received 3,447 votes and lost the seat to Ghani Muhammad Khan, a candidate of PPP.

He ran for the seat of the National Assembly of Pakistan from Constituency NA-35 (Malakand Protected Area) as a candidate of PPP in 2002 Pakistani general election but was unsuccessful. He received 17,538 votes and lost the seat to Muhammad Inayat Ur-Rehman, a candidate of Muttahida Majlis-e-Amal (MMA).

He was elected to the National Assembly from Constituency NA-35 (Malakand Protected Area) as a candidate of PPP in 2008 Pakistani general election. He received 34,472 votes and defeated Nisar Muhammad, a candidate of Pakistan Peoples Party (Sherpao) (PPP-S). In November 2008, he was inducted into the federal cabinet of Prime Minister Yousaf Raza Gillani and was appointed as the Federal Minister for Special Initiatives where he continued to serve until December 2010. From December 2012 to February 2011, he remained in the federal cabinet with the status of federal minister without any portfolio.

He ran for the seat of the National Assembly from Constituency NA-35 (Malakand) as a candidate of PPP in 2013 Pakistani general election but was unsuccessful. He received 19,081 votes and lost the seat to Junaid Akbar.

References

Pakistani MNAs 2008–2013
People from Malakand District
Living people
North-West Frontier Province MPAs 1988–1990
Year of birth missing (living people)